Fun Down There is a 1988 drama film directed by Roger Stigliano. It stars Michael Waite, who co-wrote the script with Stigliano. It premiered at the 1989 Berlin International Film Festival where it won the Teddy Award for Best Feature Film. It was released onto DVD by Frameline.

Plot
Buddy, a young gay man leaves his small-town home in rural Upstate New York to make a new life in New York City.

Cast
 Yvonne Fisher as Sandy
 Martin Goldin as Angelo
 Nickolas B. Nagourney as Joseph
 Jeanne Smith as Judy Fields
 Gretchen Sommerville as Greta
 Betty Waite as Mrs. Fields
 Harold Waite as Mr. Fields
 Michael Waite as Buddy Fields

Reception
Writing for The New York Times, Vincent Canby called the film "carefully muted [and] seriocomic". He praised lead actor Michael Waite for playing his role with "great inner humor and intelligence".

References

External links
 
 

1988 films
1988 LGBT-related films
1988 drama films
American LGBT-related films
1980s English-language films
American independent films
Films set in New York City
American drama films
LGBT-related drama films
1989 drama films
1989 films
1980s American films